Jon Russell Cring (born February 10, 1971) is a director of films and television.

Career
Cring has made 18 features since 2006. Many have premiered in film festivals all across the United States.

He also acts as a co-director on the TV series Point Society and producer on numerous other projects.

Filmography 
 Announced – Sky Valley
 2023 – Wheelies INC
 2021 – Girl in the Palms
 2016 – Darcy
 2015 – The Night We Met
 2014 – Hobo Heyseus
 2013 – Little Bi Peep
 2012 – Creeping Crawling
 2011 – And See All the People
 2009 – The Drive
 2009 – Four on the Floor
 2008 – Wonderful
 2008 – Melvyn's Clock
 2008 – $6 Man
 2008 – Has Been
 2008 – Budd
 2008 – Ought
 2008 – Bernee
 2008 – TOO
 2008 – Summer's Morn
 2006 – Lenders Morgan
 2010 – Commons (TV series)

Personal life
Born in Ohio, Cring now resides in Tuxedo Park, New York.

External links
 
 Article 1
 Article 2
 Fangoria Magazine
 Interview

Living people
American film directors
1971 births